Safaiyeh is an alternate name of Kahriz Sang, a city in Isfahan Province, Iran

Safaiyeh or Safayyeh may also refer to various places in Iran:
 Safaiyeh, alternate name of Tolombeh-ye Safaiyeh, Anar, Kerman Province
 Safaiyeh, Kermanshah
 Safaiyeh, Ravansar, Kermanshah Province
 Safaiyeh, Khuzestan
 Safaiyeh Rural District, in Razavi Khorasan Province
 Safayyeh Rural District, in Isfahan Province